Joffre David Guerrón Méndez (born April 28, 1985), commonly known as Joffre Guerrón, is an Ecuadorian professional footballer for Ecuadorian Serie A club Barcelona Sporting Club.

A right winger, his key attributes are his explosiveness and potence. A strong and accurate finisher with good aerial presence, Guerron can also play as a striker. Besides his native Ecuador, he has played in countries such as Argentina, Spain, Brazil, China and Mexico. He was awarded as the 2008 and 2015 Copa Libertadores MVP.

Nicknamed Dinamita (Spanish for dynamite), he is also known among fans for his humbleness and love to Latin music such as reggaeton and salsa.

Early life
Joffre David Guerrón Méndez, was born in a small Ecuadorian village called Ambuquí at the Imbabura Province, place where other important figures of Ecuadorian football have emerged, players such as Édison Méndez, Agustín Delgado, Ulises de la Cruz and Giovanny Espinoza.

Club career

Youth career
He made his debut in the top Ecuadorian division with SD Aucas at the very young age of 16. He was then transferred to Argentine giants Boca Juniors where he played in the lower divisions of the team; however he never got a chance to debut with the senior team. In 2006, he returned to Ecuador, this time to Liga, at the request of the then manager, Juan Carlos Oblitas.

LDU Quito
In 2007, Guerron began to hold a starting 11 position, with the new manager Edgardo Bauza. Guerron would finish the 2007 Serie A season as champion, bringing the club its 9th league title.
He impressed and dazzled many with his speed and talent as well as his pace in the 2008 Copa Libertadores with LDU Quito, scoring against Libertad of Paraguay with an individual play, and also against Estudiantes de La Plata, where Guerron took the ball individually past several defenders and shot the football very powerfully past the small space left on the goal-keeper's left side. Guerron in the semi-final versus Club America received a long pass from Jayro Campos on the right side of the field, dribbled past his defender to send the ball past Guillermo Ochoa and leave it for Luis Bolanos to just head the ball in, resulting in an important 1-1 away result. After drawing to America 0-0 at home, Liga reached the final where Guerrón played an important role in the victory over Fluminense, scoring a goal in the first leg, then putting in an energetic performance before scoring LDU's third goal in the 3-1 penalty shootout victory. He was member of the team that won Copa Libertadores in 2008, Liga Deportiva Universitaria de Quito. He was chosen by FIFA, through an election, as the best player of the 2008 Copa Libertadores.

Getafe CF
It was confirmed on June 6, 2008 that Joffre would join Getafe CF for 4 years at a price of €4M Euros. Guerron made his league debut on August 31, 2008, starting against Sporting de Gijón.
Guerron was taunted by fans of Sporting de Gijón on August 21, 2008, during his league debut match. Several parts of the stadium could be heard making monkey noises and other degrading taunts against the footballer. As a result, Swiss club teammate Fabio Celestini condemned the racist supporters in a later press conference calling them idiots and also praising Guerron's attitude throughout the match, although it was suggested that Joffre did not know the insults were directed at him. Gijón was fined a modest sum for the incident.

Cruzeiro
The club signed the Ecuadorian midfielder on loan from Getafe CF for one season, the Brazilians paid around 1 million Euros and can sign him on a permanent basis at the end of the season for 3 million. In his 2009 season debut, he played 15 league games, scoring two goals in two victories against Santo Andre and Sport Recife. On February 4, in a 2010 Copa Libertadores match, he scored a beautiful goal without virtually an angle to shoot from, winning 7-0 against Bolivian club Real Potosi. For the 2010 season, he played in only four league matches, scoring only once against Guarani in a 2-2 draw.

Atlético Paranaense
In July 2010, Joffre joined the Brazilian club Atlético Paranaense for a transfer fee of €907,000.
After playing for Paranaense for 2 seasons, he has become the teams icon and top goal-scorer. He has been shown interest by São Paulo FC, Flamengo, San Lorenzo, and more recently by Club América through the January and summer transfer windows of 2012.

Beijing Guoan FC
Guerron made his a goalscoring debut for his new club, with a signature bicycle kick. He scored his first league goal on October 20, in a 2-0 away win against Qingdao Jonoon. He ended his season with 13 games played, and 2 goals scored.
On his league debut for the 2013 Chinese Super League, he scored a beautiful goal backwards, in a 4-1 home win against Shanghai East Asia F.C. On April 5, Guerron scored the only goal in an away win against Jiangsu Sainty. On April 23, in an AFC Champions League group match against Korean giants Pohang Steelers, Guerron scored the opening goal in a 2-0 home win. On June 1, Guerron scored a chipped goal in a 4-0 home win over Liaoning Whowin. On June 22, he scored in a 2-1 away loss to Hangzhou. A week later on June 26, Guerron scored in a 3-0 home win over Shandong Luneng. On July 7, he scored his sixth goal of the season against Shanghai SIPG, in a 3-0 away win. Then a week later on July 14, Guerron scored another goal in a 3-1 home win against Wuhan Zall. On August 25 he scored in a 4-0 home win over Dalian Aerbin. On October 5, Guerron scored in a 1-1 away draw against Liaoning Whowin. On October 18, Guerron scored in a 1-1 home draw against Hangzhou.

Tigres UANL
On July 13, 2014, it was confirmed that Guerrón would be joining Liga MX side Tigres UANL. On July 26, Guerrón made his official debut with Tigres, coming on as a 63rd-minute substitute for Édgar Lugo on the 4-2 victory of Tigres over Club León at the Estadio Universitario in the second match of the team in the Apertura 2014 tournament. He scored his first goal via penalty-kick in an Apertura 2014 Copa MX game against Estudiantes de Altamira in the victory of 4-0 at the Estadio Universitario on July 29. On August 16, Guerrón scored his first goal in a League game, on the 1-1 draw against Puebla FC, at the Estadio Cuauhtémoc. On September 27, he scored the second goal for the 3-2 victory against C.F. Pachuca at the Estadio Hidalgo, with a powerful shot from outside the penalty area. On October 25, he scored a goal in the Clásico Regiomontano against C.F. Monterrey, for a 2-2 draw at the Estadio Tecnológico. On November 22, he scored the first goal of the 2-1 victory against Club Toluca at the Estadio Universitario. In the "liguilla" (play-offs), he scored the goal of the 1-1 draw against Pachuca in the away game at the Estadio Hidalgo on November 26. In the home game of the finals against Club América on December 11, 2014, Guerrón scored the goal of the 1-0 victory. On February 7, 2015, he scored the goal of the 1-0 home win over Puebla FC. He scored one goal in the 3-0 home victory against Pumas UNAM on February 28. On March 14, Guerrón scored the second goal of the 2-1 home victory against Pachuca FC. On April 4, he scored the third goal of the 3-1 home victory over Tiburones Rojos de Veracruz. He scored the second goal for the 3-1 victory over Querétaro FC at the Estadio Corregidora on April 24. On May 13, he scored the goal of the 1-1 against Santos Laguna in the quarterfinals of the play-offs. Tigres became champion of the Apertura 2015 season, but Guerrón, playing as the substitute of Jürgen Damm, scored only two goals in the season and played only one game of playoffs.

Copa Libertadores 2015
Finishing as second place of the Apertura 2014 tournament, Tigres got a ticket to play in the Copa Libertadores 2015 as "Mexico 1". On February 18, 2015, he scored two goals of the 3-0 victory against Juan Aurich at the Estadio Universitario. He scored the 1-1 goal against River Plate on March 5, at El Monumental. On March 17, he scored a goal against Club Deportivo San José in the 4-0 home victory. Tigres lost the finals against River Plate and Guerrón was named the MVP of the Cup.

Cruz Azul
On December 15, 2015, it was confirmed that Joffre Guerrón would be joining Liga MX side Cruz Azul for 2 years.

Pumas UNAM

On June 7, 2017, Club Universidad Nacional confirmed the signing of "Dinamita" Guerrón.

International career
Guerrón has represented Ecuador on a youth level, even scoring against Panama's U-20 team in a friendly match. He was called up for the first two 2010 World Cup qualifiers in October 2007 against Venezuela and Brasil and more recently against Argentina and Colombia. And has been called up for a starting position for the next games of the South American Qualifiers playing right middle. He is considered to be one of Ecuador's most promising players and has already won several caps for the senior national team. Coach Reinaldo Rueda has called Guerron back for international duty for World Cup qualifier matches.

Career statistics

Achievements

Club
LDU Quito
Serie A (1): 2007
Copa Libertadores (1): 2008

Tigres UANL
Liga MX (1): Apertura 2015

Individual
Copa Libertadores Best Player (2): 2008, 2015
Copa MX top scorer : Clausura 2016 Copa MX

Personal
He is a brother of Raúl Guerrón who participated for Ecuador in the 2002 FIFA World Cup. He is married and has one son. Guerrón is admired by his fans for his humility and love to Latin music, he has been seen in humble sectors of several cities singing and dancing with fans.

Notes

References

 Joffre Guerrón will not be part of los Rayados

External links
 
 
 
 
 Guerrón's player card of FEF's website

1985 births
Living people
People from Ibarra Canton
Association football wingers
Ecuadorian footballers
Ecuador international footballers
L.D.U. Quito footballers
S.D. Aucas footballers
Getafe CF footballers
Cruzeiro Esporte Clube players
Club Athletico Paranaense players
Beijing Guoan F.C. players
Tigres UANL footballers
Cruz Azul footballers
Club Universidad Nacional footballers
Campeonato Brasileiro Série A players
Liga MX players
Chinese Super League players
Ecuadorian expatriate footballers
Ecuadorian expatriate sportspeople in Spain
Expatriate footballers in Brazil
Expatriate footballers in Spain
Expatriate footballers in China
Expatriate footballers in Mexico